Clarisse may refer to:

People and characters

 Clarisse (given name)
 Eddy Clarisse (born 1972), a retired badminton player from Mauritius
 Clarisse (Percy Jackson), a female character in the Percy Jackson & The Olympians book
 Clarisse Midroy (1820–1870), French actress known simply as Clarisse
 Princess Clarisse, a character in The Castle of Cagliostro

Others
 Clarisse et Florent, a song related to 13th century French epic Huon de Bordeaux
 Clarisse House, the official residence of the Prime Minister of Mauritius
 Clarisses, an early name for the Poor Clares

See also
 Clarissa (disambiguation)